Trichobaris mucorea, the tobacco stalk borer, is a species of flower weevil in the family Curculionidae. It is found in North America.

This species is associated with the wild tobacco plant Nicotiana attenuata, spending most of its life cycle from egg to adult stage hidden inside the stem, where it feeds on the pith.

References

Further reading

External links

 

Baridinae
Beetles described in 1858